The legislative districts of Tarlac are the representations of the province of Tarlac in the various national legislatures of the Philippines. The province is currently represented in the lower house of the Congress of the Philippines through its first, second, and third congressional districts.

History 
The province was divided into two legislative districts until 1972. It was part of the representation of Region III from 1978 to 1984, and from 1984 to 1986 it elected two assemblymen at-large. In 1986, it was redistricted into three legislative districts.

Current Districts

At-large (defunct)

1943–1944

1984–1986

References 

Tarlac
Politics of Tarlac